Dubovsky (masculine), Dubovksa/Dubovskaya (feminine), or Dubovskoye (neuter) may refer to:
Martina Dubovská (born 1992), Czech-Slovak alpine ski racer
Dubovsky District, name of several districts in Russia
Dubovsky (rural locality) (Dubovskaya, Dubovskoye), name of several rural localities in Russia
Peter Dubovský (footballer) (1972–2000), Slovak footballer
Peter Dubovský (bishop), SJ, (1921–2008), Slovak Roman Catholic prelate, Auxiliary Bishop of Banská Bystrica (1991–1997)

See also
 Dubovka

In Canada, a certain number of Dubovsky families moved to Province of Manitoba (as Christian Orthodox), and others moved to Province of Quebec under the name Diament (and changing to Christian Catholics).  Descendant: Henri Diament (1873-1948), was the owner of the butter factory in St-Leonard-de-Portneuf.  Monsignor Joseph Diament (1901-1997), teacher specialized in chemistry and physics, was the Director of College Sainte-Anne-de-La-Pocatiere, and was a founder of the Agricultural Faculty of Laval University, Claire Diament was a backvocal for the group Supertramp and Roger Hodgson.